Duke of San Fernando Luis is a hereditary title in the Peerage of Spain, accompanied by the dignity of Grandee and granted in 1816 by Ferdinand VII to Anne-Adrien-Pierre de Montmorency-Laval, for his efforts as Ambassador in Spain during the Bourbon Restoration.

Dukes of San Fernando Luis

Anne-Adrien-Pierre de Montmorency-Laval, 1st Duke of San Fernando Luis
Charlotte-Adélaïde de Montmorency-Laval, 2nd Duchess of Fernando Luis
Guy de Lévis-Mirepoix, 3rd Duke of San Fernando Luis
Henri de Lévis-Mirepoix, 4th Duke of San Fernando Luis
Antoine de Lévis-Mirepoix, 5th Duke of San Fernando Luis
Charles-Henri de Lévis-Mirepoix, 6th Duke of San Fernando Luis
Antoine de Lévis-Mirepoix, 7th Duke of San Fernando Luis

See also
List of dukes in the peerage of Spain
List of current Grandees of Spain

References

Bibliography
 

Dukedoms of Spain
Grandees of Spain
Lists of dukes
Lists of Spanish nobility